Russell Grant's All-Star Show is an eight part astrological television show was produced by Granada Television which aired from 19 July to 6 September 1994 on afternoons on the ITV channel.

It was hosted by Russell Grant, and combined interviews with celebrity guests, audience participation and competitions. Grant also carried out various investigations, including whether Love-at-first-sight might have any astrological significance. The show was a ratings hit, clocking up the then best afternoon audiences of all time.

Grant's celebrity guests included Stephanie Beacham, Cilla Black and Barbara Windsor.

Episodes
 Episode 1: [19 July 1994] – Guests: Michael Ball, Mandy Smith
 Episode 2: [26 July 1994] – Guests: Karren Brady, David Sullivan
 Episode 3: [2 August 1994] – Guests: Zsa Zsa Gabor, Michael Praed
 Episode 4: [9 August 1994] – Guests: Lynne Perrie, John McCririck, Paul McKenna
 Episode 5: [16 August 1994] – Guests: Ken Morley, Koo Stark
 Episode 6: [23 August 1994] – Guests: Stephanie Beacham
 Episode 7: [30 August 1994] – Guests: Jane Seymour
 Episode 8: [6 September 1994] – Guests: Cilla Black, Barbara Windsor

References

External links

1994 British television series debuts
1994 British television series endings
1990s British comedy television series
British television talk shows
ITV comedy
Television series by ITV Studios
Television shows produced by Granada Television
English-language television shows